The Académie de Marseille, officially the Académie des sciences, lettres et arts de Marseille, is a French learned society based in Marseille.  It was founded in 1726 and includes those in the city involved in the arts, letters, and sciences.

History
The Académie de Marseille was created by letters patent of Louis XV in August 1726, which stated in particular that the number of members would be limited to twenty. The founding document furthermore stated that all twenty members must live in Marseille. However, the actual number of founding members was twenty-one, due to the insistence of  that Henri de Belsunce also be offered membership. This was rectified in 1730 when  resigned from the Académie and was not replaced.

Founding Members

Bibliography

External links
 Académie de Marseille - official site

1726 establishments in France
Buildings and structures in Marseille
Learned societies of France
Culture of Marseille